Tangcun may refer to:

Tangcun, Hunan (塘村镇), town in Chenzhou City, Hunan, China
Tangcun, Xincai County (棠村镇), town in Henan, China
Tangcun, Shandong (唐村镇), town in Zoucheng City, Shandong, China
Tangcun Township (唐村乡), in Fengxiang County, Shaanxi, China